The Social Freedom Party (TÖP) is a  political party in Turkey, founded on 9 March 2020. Initially a part of Socialist Refoundation Party, the group broke away from the SYKP in 2013 and established the Social Freedom Party Initiative (TÖPG), prior to declaring TÖP as a party in 2020.

Perihan Koca is one of three spokespersons of the party, alongside Pelin Kahiloğulları and Juliana Gözen. The party is noteworthy for the focus it puts on women's leadership and women's labour issues, in particular its women's organisation Purple Solidarity.

The party's ideology and political programme is heavily influenced by Hikmet Kıvılcımlı and his works. TÖP is a participant of Peoples' Democratic Congress and a member of Labour and Freedom Alliance.

In terms of international outlook, like most of the Peoples' Democratic Congress organisations, the Social Freedom Party is known to condemn Turkish and NATO militarism as well as Russian expansion, as in the case of the 2022 Russian invasion of Ukraine.

References

2020 establishments in Turkey
Communist parties in Turkey
Political parties established in 2020
Far-left politics in Turkey
Peoples' Democratic Congress